CBOT may refer to:

 CBOT-DT, a television station (channel 4.1, digital UHF 25) licensed to serve Ottawa, Ontario, Canada
 CBot (Programming language), a programming language, near C++ and Java, used in Colobot and CeeBot games.
 Chicago Board of Trade, futures and options exchange in Chicago, Illinois, USA